Padehay or Padehi may refer to:
 Padehi, Sistan and Baluchestan
 Padehay, South Khorasan

See also
 Pedehi, Sistan and Baluchestan Province